The women's 100 metre individual medley competition of the 2018 FINA World Swimming Championships (25 m) was held on 13 and 14 December 2018.

Records
Prior to the competition, the existing world and championship records were as follows.

Results

Heats
The heats were started on 13 December at 10:06.

Semifinals
The semifinals were started on 13 December at 20:06.

Semifinal 1

Semifinal 2

Final
The final was held on 14 December at 19:20.

References

Women's 100 metre individual medley